Zinda Dargor() is a Pakistani television series aired on ARY Digital. It was directed by Badar Mehmood and written by Samina Ejaz. The serial follows the life a girl, Aliya whose house gets attacked by robbers the day before her marriage thus her marriage is broken and also deals with the life of another girl Sonia. It showcases how society make girls like Aliya's life a hell and bury them alive.

Cast
Saniya Shamshad as Aliya
Noman Ejaz as Dr. Mustafa, Eliya's love interest
Waseem Abbas as Qasim, Aliya's father
Laila Zuberi as Tehmeena, Aliya's Mother
Maheen Rizvi as Sonia, Aliya's cousin elder daughter of Shehbaz and Waheeda
Ismat Zaidi as  Waheeda; Elder Sister of Qasim Aliya's aunt and Sonia's mother
Farah Nadeem as Sonia's mother in law
Manzoor Qureshi as Shehbaz, Waheeda's Husband
Adeel Chaudhry as Sonia's husband

Accolades

15th Lux Style Awards 
 Best TV Actor - Noman Ejaz - Nominated

References

External links 
 Official website

ARY Digital original programming
Pakistani television series